Aaron Sanchez may refer to:

 Aarón Sánchez (chef) (born 1976), Mexican celebrity chef
 Aaron Sanchez (baseball) (born 1992), American baseball player
 Aarón Sánchez (footballer) (born 1996), Andorran footballer